Batyushkovo is a rural locality (a village) in Vorshinskoye Rural Settlement, Sobinsky District, Vladimir Oblast, Russia. The population was 19 as of 2010.

Geography 
Batyushkovo is located 28 km northeast of Sobinka (the district's administrative centre) by road. Nazarovo is the nearest rural locality.

References 

Rural localities in Sobinsky District